A wire-frame model, also wireframe model, is a visual representation of a three-dimensional (3D) physical object used in 3D computer graphics. It is created by specifying each edge of the physical object where two mathematically continuous smooth surfaces meet, or by connecting an object's constituent vertices using (straight) lines or curves. The object is projected into screen space and rendered by drawing lines at the location of each edge. The term "wire frame" comes from designers using metal wire to represent the three-dimensional shape of solid objects. 3D wire frame computer models allow for the construction and manipulation of solids and solid surfaces. 3D solid modeling efficiently draws higher quality representations of solids than conventional line drawing.

Using a wire-frame model allows for the visualization of the underlying design structure of a 3D model. Traditional two-dimensional views and drawings/renderings can be created by the appropriate rotation of the object, and the selection of hidden line removal via cutting planes.

Since wire-frame renderings are relatively simple and fast to calculate, they are often used in cases where a relatively high screen frame rate is needed (for instance, when working with a particularly complex 3D model, or in real-time systems that model exterior phenomena). When greater graphical detail is desired, surface textures can be added automatically after the completion of the initial rendering of the wire frame. This allows a designer to quickly review solids, or rotate objects to different views without the long delays associated with more realistic rendering, or even the processing of faces and simple flat shading.

The wire frame format is also well-suited and widely used in programming tool paths for direct numerical control (DNC) machine tools.

Hand-drawn wire-frame-like illustrations date back as far as the Italian Renaissance. Wire-frame models were also used extensively in video games to represent 3D objects during the 1980s and early 1990s, when "properly" filled 3D objects would have been too complex to calculate and draw with the computers of the time. Wire-frame models are also used as the input for computer-aided manufacturing (CAM).

There are three main types of 3D computer-aided design (CAD) models; wire frame is the most abstract and least realistic. The other types are surface and solid. The wire-frame method of modelling consists of only lines and curves that connect the points or vertices and thereby define the edges of an object.

Simple example of wireframe model
An object is specified by two tables: (1) Vertex Table, and, (2) Edge Table. 
 
The vertex table consists of three-dimensional coordinate values for each vertex with reference to the origin. 

Edge table specifies the start and end vertices for each edge.

A naive interpretation could create a wire-frame representation by simply drawing straight lines between the screen coordinates of the appropriate vertices using the edge list.

Unlike representations designed for more detailed rendering, face information is not specified (it must be calculated if required for solid rendering). 

Appropriate calculations have to be performed to transform the 3D coordinates of the vertices into 2D screen coordinates.

See also
 Animation
 3D computer graphics
 Computer animation
 Computer-generated imagery (CGI)
 Mockup
 Polygon mesh
 Vector graphics
 Virtual cinematography

References

 Principles of Engineering Graphics by Maxwell Macmillan International Editions
 ASME Engineer's Data Book by Clifford Matthews
 Engineering Drawing by N.D. Bhatt
 Texturing and Modeling by Davis S. Ebert
 3D Computer Graphics by Alan Watt

Computer graphics data structures
3D imaging
Virtual reality